Kate O'Brien (born 23 July 1988 in Calgary) is a Canadian female track cyclist and former bobsledder. She won a silver medal at the 2020 Summer Paralympics.

Career
After being introduced to bobsleigh in 2010, O’Brien competed at the 2013 FIBT World Championships with pilot Jenny Ciochetti, but a torn hamstring took her out of the first half of the Olympic season and she missed qualifying as a bobsleigh brakeman for the 2014 Winter Olympics. She decided to try piloting a bobsled and attended driving school in Calgary in March 2014. At the same time, there was a testing camp for Cycling Canada at the Canadian Sport Institute. Having scored good test results, she was competing internationally within months. In September, she debuted at the Pan American Championships, finishing fifth in both the team sprint (with Monique Sullivan) and the keirin. O’Brien split 2014-15 between track cycling and bobsleigh, competing on both World Cup circuits as well as at both world championships. At the 2015 UCI Track Cycling World Championships, she and Sullivan finished twelfth in the women's team sprint. In June 2015, she broke the 200 m time trial record that stood for 19 years at the Lehigh Valley Preferred Cycling Center in Trexlertown, Pennsylvania. By the following month, O'Brien and Sullivan set a track record to capture the women's sprint title at the 2015 Pan American Games in Toronto. Moreover, she managed to add a silver to her Pan American Games career tally in the individual sprint race, with the gold going to her teammate Sullivan.

In 2016, she was officially named to Canada's 2016 Olympic team.

O'Brien claimed 5th place at the 2017 World Championships (in the team sprint, with Amelia Walsh), and silver in the 2017 World Cup in L.A. She is the current Canadian record holder in the 500m time trial and in the team sprint.

In 2017 a disastrous training accident left her fighting for life and left her with extensive injuries. These included a severe head injury that left her unable to walk, talk or breathe unassisted. She was informed by her doctors that she would be unable to participate in sports again. She did not accept this and fought to recover, and despite having now been diagnosed as epileptic, has returned to the sport and has been inducted by the Canadian Para-Cycling team, where she continued her training before her debut with the team in the UCI Para Cycling Track Championships.  In this event, she set a new word record time for the C4 500m sprint and won a gold medal as well as a world record for the 200m time trial.
She continued her recovery and hopes to be named to the Canadian paralympic cycling team in 2020  At the 2020 Summer Olympics, she finished second in the C4-5 500 metres time trial and did not finish in the road cycling time trial.

Career results

2014
3rd Team Sprint, Copa Internacional de Pista (with Sara Byers)
2015
Pan American Games
1st  Team Sprint (with Monique Sullivan)
2nd  Sprint
Milton International Challenge
1st Team Sprint (with Monique Sullivan)
3rd Sprint
2nd Sprint, US Sprint GP
3rd Team Sprint, Pan American Track Championships (with Monique Sullivan)
2016
1st Keirin, Fastest Man on Wheels
Milton International Challenge
2nd Keirin 
2nd Sprint
Festival of Speed 
2nd Keirin
2nd Sprint
2017
5th Team Sprint, World Championships
2nd Sprint, US Sprint GP
2020
1st WR 500m Sprint 
1st WR 200m Time trial

See also
 Georgia Simmerling, Canadian track cyclist who has competed in Summer and Winter Olympics
 Clara Hughes, Canadian cyclist who has competed in Summer and Winter Olympics

References

External links
 
 
 

1988 births
Living people
Sportspeople from Calgary
Canadian female bobsledders
Cyclists from Alberta
Canadian female cyclists
Olympic cyclists of Canada
Cyclists at the 2015 Pan American Games
Pan American Games gold medalists for Canada
Pan American Games silver medalists for Canada
Cyclists at the 2016 Summer Olympics
Cyclists at the 2020 Summer Paralympics
Pan American Games medalists in cycling
Medalists at the 2015 Pan American Games
Medalists at the 2020 Summer Paralympics
Paralympic medalists in cycling
Paralympic silver medalists for Canada
21st-century Canadian women